Gyula Zsivótzky (25 February 1937 – 29 September 2007) was a Hungarian hammer thrower. He won a gold medal at the 1968 Olympics, silvers in 1960 and 1964, and finished fifth in 1972. Zsivótzky set two world record: one in 1965 and the other in 1968. He was twice elected as Hungarian Sportsman of the Year: in 1965, after winning at the Summer Universiade, and in 1968, for his Olympic gold medal.

Zsivótzky retired in 1973 and later worked in the clothing industry. He remained involved with athletics as an administrator, becoming a member of the Hungarian Olympic Committee and vice-president of his athletic club Újpesti TE. He married Magdolna Komka, an Olympic high jumper. One of his sons is decathlete Attila Zsivoczky, the other is football player Gyula Zsivóczky Jr.

Zsivótzky died from cancer in his native Budapest, aged 70.

References

External links 

 

1937 births
2007 deaths
Athletes (track and field) at the 1960 Summer Olympics
Athletes (track and field) at the 1964 Summer Olympics
Athletes (track and field) at the 1968 Summer Olympics
Athletes (track and field) at the 1972 Summer Olympics
Hungarian male hammer throwers
Olympic athletes of Hungary
Olympic gold medalists for Hungary
Olympic silver medalists for Hungary
Athletes from Budapest
Deaths from cancer in Hungary
European Athletics Championships medalists
Medalists at the 1968 Summer Olympics
Medalists at the 1964 Summer Olympics
Medalists at the 1960 Summer Olympics
Olympic gold medalists in athletics (track and field)
Olympic silver medalists in athletics (track and field)
Universiade medalists in athletics (track and field)
Universiade gold medalists for Hungary
Medalists at the 1959 Summer Universiade
Medalists at the 1961 Summer Universiade
Medalists at the 1963 Summer Universiade
Medalists at the 1965 Summer Universiade
20th-century Hungarian people
21st-century Hungarian people